Champlain is an unincorporated community in Essex County, Virginia, United States.  It lies at the junction of U.S. Route 17 and Route 631 in a rural region of the county.

Champlain's zip code is 22438.

The Glebe House of St. Anne's Parish, St. Matthew's Church, and Linden are listed on the National Register of Historic Places.

References

Unincorporated communities in Essex County, Virginia
Unincorporated communities in Virginia